We're Back! A Dinosaur's Story is a 1993 British-American animated adventure comedy film directed by Dick Zondag, Ralph Zondag, Phil Nibbelink, and Simon Wells from a screenplay by John Patrick Shanley. Based on the 1987 Hudson Talbott children's book of the same name, it tells the story of four dinosaurs who travel to the present day and become intelligent by eating a "Brain Grain" cereal invented by scientist Captain Neweyes. The film was produced by Steven Spielberg's Amblimation studio and features the voices of John Goodman, Felicity Kendal, Charles Fleischer, Walter Cronkite, Jay Leno, Julia Child, Kenneth Mars, Yeardley Smith, and Martin Short. 

We're Back! A Dinosaur's Story was released by  Universal Pictures on November 24, 1993; it was marketed as the more family-friendly equivalent of Spielberg's Jurassic Park, which was released the same year. The film became a box-office bomb, grossing only $9.3 million worldwide, and received mixed reviews from critics: while its animation, score, and voice performances were praised, most criticisms targeted its story, pacing, and lack of character development.

Plot
In present-day New York City, an Eastern bluebird named Buster runs away from his siblings and he meets an intelligent orange Tyrannosaurus named Rex, who is playing golf. He explains to Buster that he was once a ravaging dinosaur, and proceeds to tell his personal story.

A scientist, Captain Neweyes, wants children of the present day to see real dinosaurs from the Mesozoic era. He and his  alien assistant Vorb go back in time to collect dinosaurs, give them the cereal 'Brain Grain' to bestow them sentience, and send them to the present day. The dinosaurs Neweyes has collected include an orange Tyrannosaurus rex named Rex, a blue Triceratops named Woog, a purple Pteranodon named Elsa, and a green Parasaurolophus named Dweeb. Neweyes welcomes them aboard his ship, explains his plan to take them to Dr. Julia Bleeb, who will guide them to the Museum of Natural History, and warns them to avoid Professor Screweyes, his nefarious twin brother who causes mischief after having lost his left eye several years ago.

Neweyes drops the dinosaurs in the Hudson River in the year 1993 AD, but they are unable to meet up with Dr. Bleeb. They encounter two children willing to help them find the museum – a boy named Louie, who is running away to join the circus, and a girl named Cecilia. To avoid being noticed as real dinosaurs, they pretend to be themselves as animatronics in the Macy's Thanksgiving Day Parade. The illusion falls apart, however, when Rex accidentally deflates an Apatosaurus balloon after performing a musical number  during the parade thus blowing their cover. The citizens panic and the dinosaurs flee to Central Park while being pursued by the police and the army.

Meanwhile, Louie and Cecilia meet Professor Screweyes, who is running the horror-themed "Eccentric Circus". Unaware of Screweyes' dark nature, the children sign a contract to perform in his troupe. When the dinosaurs arrive to save Louie and Cecilia, Screweyes devolves the children into chimpanzees using "Brain Drain", pills that are the polar opposite of Brain Grain. The dinosaurs consume the pills, which cause them to lose their intelligence and revert to their natural forms, in exchange for Screweyes restoring Louie and Cecilia to humans and releasing them. The next morning, a clown named Stubbs, who works for Professor Screweyes, informs the two kids about Screweyes' plan to exploit the dinosaurs for their scare potential.

That night, Louie and Cecilia sneak into the circus, where the dinosaurs perform their terrifying act – Screweyes hypnotizing Rex – before the trick is hindered by a crow turning on flares. Rex grabs and prepares to eat Screweyes, but Louie steps in and talks the Tyrannosaurus out of his vengeance. His and Cecilia's impassioned pleas and loving touch restore the dinosaurs' sentience. Stubbs resigns from Professor Screweyes' employment, and Captain Neweyes arrives in his ship to lift the kids and the dinosaurs out of the circus, leaving Screweyes to be devoured by crows. The dinosaurs spend the rest of their lives in the museum, fulfilling Neweyes' plan, while Louie and Cecilia reconcile with their respective parents and become a couple.

Rex returns Buster to his family, ignoring his brothers' taunts while hugging his mom, and Rex tells him to remember his story before leaving for the museum.

Voice cast

 John Goodman as Rex, a kind Tyrannosaurus rex.
 René Le Vant as Woog, a gluttonous Triceratops.
 Felicity Kendal as Elsa, an elegant Pteranodon.
 Charles Fleischer as Dweeb, a half-witted Parasaurolophus (originally intended to be an Apatosaurus).
 Walter Cronkite as Captain Neweyes, an inventor who brings the dinosaurs to the present.
 Jay Leno as Vorb, an alien that works for Captain Neweyes.
 Joey Shea as Louie, a brave young boy from a lower-class background who runs away to join a circus.
 Julia Child as Dr. Juliet Bleeb, a worker at the Museum of Natural History.
 Kenneth Mars as Professor Screweyes, Captain Neweyes' evil twin brother who runs a circus.
 Yeardley Smith as Cecilia Nuthatch, a young girl from a wealthy family who is neglected by her parents.
 Martin Short as Stubbs the Clown, a clown who used to work for Professor Screweyes.
 Blaze Berdahl as Buster the Bird, a bird who is running away from home and is told the film's plot by Rex.
 Rhea Perlman as Buster's Mother

Production 

Hanna-Barbera was the first company to contact Hudson Talbott about obtaining rights to his 1987 book We're Back! A Dinosaur's Story, and the encounter occurred only months after its release; Universal Pictures then paid off Hanna-Barbera and purchased the rights for Spielberg to produce the film through his studio Amblimation. John Musker and Ron Clements were also interested in adapting the book for Walt Disney Feature Animation, as a potential project after The Little Mermaid, but were informed that Universal and Spielberg had already purchased the rights. Musker envisioned their version "like Snow White and the Seven Dwarfs, but a 7-year-old Snow White and with dinosaurs instead of the dwarfs".

Although Talbott had little involvement, he encountered the creators of the film many times during production, including Spielberg who would make several calls to the author from Los Angeles and had a personal meeting with him when he first arrived in London. We're Back! A Dinosaur's Story was directed by Simon Wells, Phil Nibbelink, and the brothers Dick and Ralph Zondag. Nibbelink was the most involved with the project out of the four directors, Wells only co-directed during the writing process before he was assigned to direct Balto shortly after. All of the directors frequently rotated in and out between projects in Amblimation, with We're Back!, Balto and development on a failed animated adaptation of Andrew Lloyd Webber's musical Cats happening at the same time.

Storyboarding of We're Back! A Dinosaur's Story began in 1990 during the production of An American Tail: Fievel Goes West. The source material was only 20 pages and lacked any antagonist or sense of a plot, making it difficult to convert to a full-length feature. The first screenplay draft was written by Flint Dille and Wells and was not well-received by Spielberg. John Patrick Shanley, writer of Moonstruck, had worked with Spielberg on Joe Versus the Volcano. Spielberg hired Shanley to write another draft, which was done quickly and was the script ultimately used. Shanley made the previous draft darker, which Spielberg liked but Nibbelink disagreed with. Talbott was often skeptical about how the book was being adapted, so Nibbelink instructed the author to have a positive mindset. Talbott felt Shanley's script had none of the book's tongue-in-cheek humor. Near the end of production, $1 million worth of alterations were made following a poor test screening at Universal, including the addition of the Macy's parade scene; the scene features a song originally written for the film by James Horner and Thomas Dolby, "Roll Back the Rock", which Little Richard also sings in the end credits. We're Back was also the first animated film not produced by Disney to fully use digital ink-and-paint technology to complete the animation, while additional animation was provided by Character Builders, Inc. and Lightbox Animation.

Director Phil Nibbelink voiced the characters in animatics, which involved successful imitations of notable figures like Walter Cronkite and Julia Child; Spielberg, enjoying Nibbelink's voicing, cast the people that were impersonated in the animatics. John Goodman started recording his voices shortly after having his wisdom teeth removed, and healed his face between takes. We're Back! A Dinosaur's Story was not Wells' first encounter with Felicity Kendal, as he previously asked to work with her on a student project that she declined. Originally John Malkovich recorded the voice of Screweyes, but Spielberg thought his performance was too frightening. Christopher Lloyd then recorded for the character but Spielberg rejected it too; the producer went with Kenneth Mars for his pliability with voicing the character. The voice actors and Nibbelink found Shanley's dialogue a bit unnatural, so they changed a few lines while recording; however, this was not approved by Shanley, so recordings of his original dialogue were in the final film.

Release and promotion 

We're Back! A Dinosaur's Story was meant to capitalize on a craze of dinosaurs in popular culture known as the dinosaur renaissance, which started in the 1960s. The mania included an explosion of dinosaur content in film and television, including television cartoons like Cadillacs and Dinosaurs and  Extreme Dinosaurs, with many more produced that were attributed to the release and success of Steven Spielberg's Jurassic Park. We're Back! A Dinosaur's Story was released the same year as Jurassic Park, and was marketed as the more family-friendly Spielberg-made dinosaur film; the tagline in promotional materials was "A dinosaur adventure for the whole family". Fiction in the dinosaur renaissance presented the creatures in a more friendly and upfront manner; We're Back! A Dinosaur's Story, for example, depicts dinosaurs in an American suburb doing activities like playing golf.

We're Back! A Dinosaur's Story was heavily advertised and promoted with merchandise and fast food tie-ins. A balloon of Rex floated at the real-life 1993 Macy's Thanksgiving Day Parade, which deflated after coming into contact with a traffic light. Hi-Tech Expressions also published platform video games based on the film for the Sega Genesis. Game Boy and Super Nintendo Entertainment System (SNES). In the Genesis and SNES games, the player plays as Cecilia and Louie helping the dinosaurs get to the museum; while the Game Boy game, a reskinned version of the existing game Baby T-Rex, involves the dinosaur Rex as a playable character rescuing the other three dinosaurs captured by Screweyes.

We're Back! A Dinosaur's Story was released to American theaters on November 24, 1993. It was released on March 15, 1994 on home video. Each copy included pockets of reusable stickers and coupons for Universal Theme Parks and products from Nestle, The Hertz Corporation, and First Alert.

Reception

Box office 
In the United States, We're Back! A Dinosaur's Story opened during the Thanksgiving holiday with other new entries including Mrs. Doubtfire, A Perfect World and a film adaptation of George Balanchine's The Nutcracker. It grossed $4.6 million on its opening week, well below expectations. Its opening weekend at the time was attributed to snow storms and weather patterns across the country and had also affected the rest of the film box office that weekend. In its second weekend, We're Back! A Dinosaur's Story grossed $1.5 million, a 60% decline. Its run ended with a total gross of $9.3 million, with journalists quickly evaluating its run as a commercial flop. Journalists called the commercial performance of the film an indicator of how difficult it was to compete with Walt Disney Feature Animation, as from a commercial perspective at the time most of Disney's animated features were commercial successes while other animated films released within those years had performed either disappointingly or outright bombed.  Steven Hulett of the union Motion Picture Screen Cartoonists argued the low performances of these films, including We're Back! A Dinosaur's Story, resulted to a lack of focus on plot in a story-driven medium like animation.

Critical response 
We're Back! A Dinosaur's Story garnered generally mixed reviews from professional critics. As of September 2021, We're Back! Audiences polled by CinemaScore gave the film an average grade of "B" on an A+ to F scale.

An extremely favorable review from Cashbox magazine called it "delightful fun" for children and adults with "warmth, eye-catching visuals and a few chills"; while Roger Ebert of the Chicago Sun-Times, in his one-star review, thought it wouldn't compete well in the animated film industry due to its "routine" animation and "shallow and kind of dumb" writing. As a critic for The Baltimore Sun summarized his problems with the film, there were "terrific ideas" blurred by "lacking in wit, emotion, memorable music and, most importantly, magic"; and the voice actors are "shackled with insipid dialogue and few opportunities to shine". Some journalists, including Ebert, found the film more like a television cartoon for kids than an actual feature. Coverage included unfavorable comparisons to other Spielberg-produced animations, such as series like Tiny Toon Adventures (1990–1992) and Animaniacs (1993–1998) and films such as The Land Before Time (1988), which also featured dinosaurs. Critics also attacked an easter egg as shameless self-promotion for Spielberg, where a poster of Jurassic Park is seen on a theater building during the parade scene.

Several reviews found the story convoluted, Robert W. Butler calling it "complicated and superficial". Butler and Asbury Park Press writer Eleanor O'Sullivan found the flashback framing device pointless and obnoxious; while the Ottawa Citizens Laura Robin reported inconsistencies, such as with Rex's weight where a light raft holds him yet a bigger dock doesn't. Variety Daniel M. Kimmel found the villain and his motivations not only convoluted but also ableist, as the film attributes his malevolence to his loss of an eye. Jane Horwitz and Janet Maslin noted other iffy moments, such as the police chase, drugging of dinosaurs, the scary circus scenes, and Screweyes' death. The film was considered cliched, preachy, and unoriginal, such as by Pamella Bruce of the Austin Chronicle; she described it as a rip-off of The Jungle Book (1967) that stole elements of the works of Tim Burton and Alfred Hitchcock. Even a favorable review from the Hartford Courants Roger Catlin found recycled aspects of the child characters, particularly Cecilia's "poor little rich girl" lifestyle, Louie's Bowery Boys-esque wise-guy attitude, and him running away to join the circus. Reviewers also felt the writing lacked humor and imagination, Pensacola News Journals Marshall Fine claiming the dialogue was more stuffed than witty.

The fast pacing was also targeted. Some critics argued it caused elements of the writing, particularly its characters, to not fully develop. Robin wrote Vorb, Stubbs, and Dr. Juliet Bleeb were nothing more than cameos for celebrity voice actors, while Charles Soloman of the Los Angeles Times noted many motivations and feelings of the dinosaurs being unknown, specifically with their relationship with Louie and Cecilia and their sacrificing of intelligence, and argued these unclarities made it difficult to be emotionally invested into them. David Elliot argued the pace didn't allowed for relaxation or moments to be fully emotional, and Soloman similarly opined that it made scenes like the flight through Manhattan far less enjoyable.

The animation was generally acclaimed, a frequently-noted aspect being its mixture of traditional and computer animation. 3D backgrounds, such as those of Manhattan during the flight sequence, were a common highlight, Butler also noting the design of NewEyes' spaceship. Catlin praised the characters as "agreeable and fast-moving", and eagerly noted "all sorts of show-offy animation details such as smoke and shadows". However, the visuals also garnered some lukewarm reactions and were considered inferior to Jurassic Park and the works of Disney. Horwitz felt it "lacks the gorgeous background detail" and "heart-tugging romance" of Disney films. Some critics also panned the non-differentiable designs of the kids.

Multiple reviews positively commented on the voice cast. Some found Cronkite's voice acting one of the film's most hilarious moments. Kimmel called Goodman and Short the top actors, stated Mars and Smith were "handling their chores", and found it amusing Cronkite and Child were voicing animated characters. Robin enjoyed the characters, particularly finding Rex and Captain NewEyes "inspired." Critics also highlighted the Macy's Thanksgiving Day Parade scene, particularly the dinosaurs' performance of "Roll Back the Rock", Kimmel calling it the film's best scene.

Accolades 
For his work on We're Back! A Dinosaur's Story, supervising sound editor Alexander Campbell Askew was nominated for Outstanding Achievement in Sound Editing for an Animated Feature at the Motion Picture Sound Editors' Golden Reel Awards.

Modern reception 
Mixed opinions continued in retrospective coverage. Seventeen, in 2017, listed it as one of the 18 best-animated films to view on Netflix;  and Country Living, in 2019, included it in a list of the 15 best kid-friendly dinosaur films. On the other hand, The A.V. Club placed it in its 2015 list of the 14 worst dinosaur media; and Paste, that same year, ranked the dinosaur characters the ninth-worst in popular culture, calling them the "silliest, most annoying of the animated dinosaurs". The A.V. Club also ranked Screweyes' devouring by the crows the 19th most terrifying moment in children's entertainment. /Films Dalin Rowell felt that, despite its poor character animation and bizarre writing, the incorporation of a horror circus and real dinosaurs dancing on city streets would fascinate children's minds, and the character of Rex would appeal to young audiences looking for a supportive and very fun friend. Common Sense Media's Renee Schonfeld called it "clever enough, visually appealing enough, and brisk enough to make it satisfying". He praised the "engaging" child protagonists, voice acting, and parade scene, although felt it suffered from an "often tangled, overloaded story" with too many characters.

See also
 Dink, the Little Dinosaur

References

External links

 
 

1993 films
1993 animated films
1990s adventure films
1990s American animated films
1990s British animated films
1990s science fiction comedy films
Amblin Entertainment animated films
Films about fear
American adventure comedy films
American children's animated adventure films
American children's animated comic science fiction films
American children's animated science fantasy films
Animated films about dinosaurs
Animated films based on children's books
Animated films about time travel
Animated films set in prehistory
Amblin Entertainment films
British children's animated films
British films set in New York City
Circus films
Films scored by James Horner
Films directed by Phil Nibbelink
Films directed by Simon Wells
Films directed by Ralph Zondag
Animated films set in Manhattan
Films with screenplays by John Patrick Shanley
Thanksgiving in films
Universal Pictures animated films
Universal Pictures films
1993 directorial debut films
1993 comedy films
1990s children's animated films
1990s English-language films
British adventure comedy films
British science fantasy films
1990s British films